Harry Liivrand (born 17 June 1961 in Tallinn) is an Estonian art critic, art historian, curator and diplomat.

Biography 
In 1984–1993, he worked as a senior researcher at the Estonian Art Museum. After the restoration of Estonian independence, he started working in the press, working for the newspaper Hommikuleht. However, for more than ten years he worked as an art and culture editor at Eesti Ekspress (1991 and 1994–2008). At the same time, she worked as a curator in the Tallinn galleries Deco (1994–1998) and Viviann Napp (2002–2006). He has organized dozens of exhibitions in Estonia and abroad.

1991 and 1991–2008, he was an art and cultural editor at the newspaper Eesti Ekspress.

In 2008, he became the head of Tallinn Art Hall.

Awards 
 2006: Kristjan Raud Prize
 2018: Order of the White Star, V class.

References

Living people
1961 births
Estonian critics
Estonian art historians
Estonian diplomats
University of Tartu alumni
People from Tallinn
Recipients of the Order of the White Star, 5th Class